The year 512 BC was a year of the pre-Julian Roman calendar. In the Roman Empire, it was known as year 242 Ab urbe condita . The denomination 512 BC for this year has been used since the early medieval period, when the Anno Domini calendar era became the prevalent method in Europe for naming years.

Events

By place

China 
 Sun Tzu, author of The Art of War, begins serving King Helü of the State of Wu as his general and military strategist (approximate date).
 The State of Xu is disestablished following attacks by the states of Wu and Chu.

Births

Deaths 
 Qing, ruler (duke) of the  State of Jin

References